Flag of Macedonia may refer to:
Flag of Macedonia (Greece)
Flag of North Macedonia